Johannes "Jos" Silvis (born 14 November 1953) is a Dutch law professor and judge. He was a judge at the European Court of Human Rights from 1 November 2012 through 1 September 2016. He subsequently became attorney general at the Supreme Court of the Netherlands.

Biography
Silvis was born in 1953 in Winschoten. He obtained a bachelor's degree in law from Erasmus University Rotterdam in 1977. By 1979 he had obtained a master's degree in penal and constitutional law. Between 1980 and 1993 he was a lecturer at the faculty of law of Utrecht University.

Between 1994 and 2001 Silvis was judge and later vice-president of the court of Rotterdam. In 2001 he moved to the High Court of Appeal in The Hague, where he served until 2010 with a two-year hiatus between 2003 and 2005 as judge and vice-president. During his hiatus he worked for the Committee on Criminal Procedure and Legislation of the Dutch Ministry of Justice. He was Advocate-General to the Supreme Court of the Netherlands between 2010 and 2012.

European Court of Human Rights
On 26 June 2012 a vote was held by the Parliamentary Assembly of the Council of Europe on the new judge to the European Court of Human Rights. Silvis was one of the three nominees, the others being Taru Spronken and Adriana van Dooijeweert. In the first round of voting Silvis obtained 61 votes, Spronken 85 and Van Dooijeweert 58. As no candidate reached the required majority of 103 votes a second round of voting was held on 27 June. A relative majority was enough to be elected this time, Silvis obtained 59 votes, Spronken 57 and Van Dooijeweert 38. Hereby Silvis was elected. On 1 November 2012 he succeeded Egbert Myjer.

Silvis resigned per 1 September 2016 to become attorney general at the Supreme Court of the Netherlands, he succeeded .

References

1953 births
Living people
People from Winschoten
20th-century Dutch judges
Dutch legal scholars
Erasmus University Rotterdam alumni
Academic staff of Utrecht University
Judges of the European Court of Human Rights
Dutch judges of international courts and tribunals
21st-century Dutch judges